Aeroplan is a coalition loyalty program owned by Air Canada, Canada's flag carrier. The Aeroplan program was created in July 1984 by Air Canada as an incentive program for its frequent flyer customers. In 2002 it was spun off as a separate corporate entity and eventually sold to Aimia.  On May 11, 2017, Air Canada announced it plans to launch a new loyalty program to replace the Aeroplan program in 2020. On August 21, 2018, Air Canada, along with TD, CIBC and Visa, agreed to acquire Aeroplan from Aimia for CA$450 million in cash. There are approximately 5 million active members in the program. On August 11, 2020, Air Canada released details about its new loyalty program, which was a relaunch of Aeroplan.

In recent years, Aeroplan has evolved into a loyalty marketing program with retail partners such as Home Hardware, Birks and Nestlé Canada. Aeroplan is also used by Air Creebec, Canadian North, Calm Air, and First Air. Internally, Aeroplan has deployed the MicroStrategy platform for business intelligence reporting and analytics for its personnel to analyze member information, track purchasing patterns, identify profiles of loyal members, and align its loyalty program with members' preferences.

Many Aeroplan members collect miles via credit cards. Credit cards were originally allocated to CIBC and Diners Club/enRoute, but were later offered to AMEX Bank of Canada, while Diners Club withdrew from the program. (The contract with CIBC expired at the end of 2013, and Aimia began a new partnership for credit cards with Toronto-Dominion Bank as the primary issuer, with CIBC relegated to a secondary role of January 1, 2014.)

In 2012, approximately 2.3 million rewards were issued to members, including more than 1.6 million flights on Air Canada or other Star Alliance carriers, which offer travel to more than 1,000 destinations worldwide.

Corporate history

When it was created in 1984, Aeroplan's operations were fully integrated with those of Air Canada. In 2002, Aeroplan was spun off as a wholly owned subsidiary of Air Canada.

In June 2005, Air Canada's parent company, ACE Aviation Holdings, sold 12.5% of Aeroplan for $250 million through an initial public offering, thereby creating the world's first publicly traded loyalty program, Aeroplan Income Fund, at a valuation of $2 billion.

On December 20, 2007, Aeroplan Income Fund acquired Loyalty Management Group, a loyalty marketing and customer-driven insight and analysis business that owns and operates Nectar, the UK's leading coalition loyalty program.

On May 28, 2008, ACE Aviation Holdings disposed of its remaining holdings in the fund for $438 million. As such, the Aeroplan program was no longer under direct control of Air Canada.

The corporate name was changed to Aimia in order to "reflect the fact that the program has grown and diversified into a comprehensive customer loyalty program with hundreds of participating retailers."

In November 2018, Aimia signed a definitive agreement with Air Canada to sell Aeroplan back to Air Canada for $450M in cash. This means Air Canada successfully sold Aeroplan for a combined $688 million, and repurchased it 10 years later for $450 million, for a profit of $238 million before expenses or inflation adjustments. Accounting for inflation yields a sale price of $832.2 in 2018 dollars, resulting in a profit of $382M before expenses.

Competition

Aeroplan faces competition from many sources, including other airline reward programs (even within Star Alliance), various bank-affiliated credit card loyalty plans, and the Air Miles program.

Mileage expiration
Aeroplan points expire if the member has no account activity for a period of 18 months.  In the past, Aeroplan had a policy where all miles would expire after seven years, even if there was continued activity in the account.  This policy has since been cancelled as of June 27, 2013.

Class action lawsuit

When miles expire, Aeroplan offers to restore the miles for a fee of $30 plus $0.01 per mile, which in some instances has resulted in charges of several thousand dollars for high-mileage members. Members have argued that Aeroplan had already been paid for the miles through the selling partner by virtue of the retail pricing and by fees charged for certain collector credit cards. As a result, on many blogs, members were upset that their miles had been emptied from their accounts.

As Aeroplan refused to give the miles back, a class action lawsuit was launched by Montreal lawyer Owen Falquero of Merchant Law Group LLP.

On August 3, 2009, the Quebec Superior Court granted authorization to launch a class-action lawsuit challenging Groupe Aeroplan Inc.'s practice of cancelling points accumulated in its loyalty program. The motion, obtained by Montreal lawyer Owen Falquero of Merchant Law Group LLP, was filed on behalf of about seven plaintiffs across Canada; however, thousands of petitioners have registered for membership in the class. The motion was filed formally on behalf of Noella Neale of Port Coquitlam, BC, a single mother whose 150,000 points were annulled by Aeroplan because she had not made a contribution or a redemption in her account for one year, a period during which she had fallen ill. Those points fell victim to Aeroplan's rules, under which the company erases points in an account that has been dormant for 12 months. In a telephone interview, Neale said she had been going to pay for her daughter's trip to New Zealand—her graduation gift—until she tried to pay from her account and saw that it had been emptied. Aeroplan spokeswoman JoAnne Hayes declined to comment on the issue because it is now before the courts. In a statement, Aeroplan noted, "no class action has yet been filed. This motion is the first procedural step before any such action can be instituted." The company stated, "petitioners (are) seek(ing) court permission to sue Aeroplan on behalf of program members in Canada to obtain reinstatement of expired miles, reimbursement of any amounts already expended by Aeroplan members to reinstate their expired miles, $50 in compensatory damages and an undetermined amount in exemplary damages on behalf of each class member, all in relation to changes made to the Aeroplan program concerning accumulation and expiry of Aeroplan Miles as announced Oct. 16th, 2006." But Aeroplan stressed that it "is of the view that there are good grounds for opposing the motion for authorization and will vigorously defend any class action, should one be authorized by the court." Neale said, "I felt like they stole from me." "If the bank took my money like that, it would be theft. I earned those points. They belong to me, and (Aeroplan) has no right to take them away from me."

Status Levels

Prior to Air Canada's acquisition and relaunch of the program in 2020, Aeroplan rewarded users with status levels upon reaching a particular level of points accumulation in a given year. This program was called Aeroplan Distinction.  The levels were Aeroplan Silver, Aeroplan Black, and Aeroplan Diamond, requiring 25,000, 50,000, and 100,000 miles, respectively. Most points qualified for these levels, including those from credit card spending and actual flying, but excluded points from credit card sign up bonuses, prizes, etc.  At higher levels, members were rewarded with less expensive flight redemptions, priority access to call centers, and status matching with other rewards/loyalty programs.

The Aeroplan status program was a different program from the Air Canada Altitude rewards program, which grants status and rewards while dealing with Air Canada directly.  With Aeroplan back in the Air Canada fold, the Silver/Black/Diamond status program was eliminated for a refreshed Altitude rewards program.

Earn miles
 Earn Aeroplan Miles with Air Canada: For travel on flights within Canada and between Canada and the continental United States (including Hawaii), 25% of miles flown are earned for Tango Class, 100% of miles flown are earned for Tango Plus and Executive Class Lowest, and 150% of miles flown are earned for Executive Class Flexible. For travel on flights for all other destinations worldwide, 100% of miles flown are earned for Tango Plus, 125% for Executive Class Lowest, and 150% for Executive Class Flexible.
 Earn Aeroplan Miles when booking from AirCanada.com: Earn up to 1 Aeroplan Mile for every dollar spent when you purchase an eligible ticket at AirCanada.com (Canadian and US edition only). Earn 1 Aeroplan mile for every 3 dollars spent when you purchase an eligible Flight Pass at AirCanada.com (Canadian and US edition only).
 Other partners: Aeroplan miles can be earned and used to redeem flights from Air Canada and partner airlines. Air Canada is part of the Star Alliance, a group of 28 airlines that co-operate to expand the offerings of each individual airline. Awards are redeemable on any one of these airlines. Each flight is allocated a certain number of "award seats" available to be used for award redemption. There are also travel and retail partners who award Aeroplan miles for being a customer of their services.

Buy miles 
Since May 2020, Air Canada allows to purchase or gift Aeroplan miles. Until then, buying miles was only available when booking flight rewards, which remains the same.

Airline partners

Fully integrated airline partners
 Air Canada
 Air Canada Express
 Air Canada Rouge

Star Alliance partner airlines
 Aegean Airlines
 Air China
 Air Dolomiti
 Air India
 Air New Zealand
 All Nippon Airways (ANA)
 Asiana Airlines
 Austrian Airlines
 Avianca
 Brussels Airlines
 Copa Airlines
 Croatia Airlines
 Egyptair
 Ethiopian Airlines
 EVA Airways
 LOT
 Lufthansa
   Scandinavian Airlines (SAS)
 Shenzhen Airlines
 Singapore Airlines
 South African Airways
 Swiss International Air Lines
 TAP Air Portugal
 Thai Airways International
 Turkish Airlines
 United Airlines

Other partners
 Aer Lingus
 Aeromar
 Air Creebec
 Air Mauritius
 Air Serbia 
 Azul Brazilian Airlines
 Bamboo Airways
 Calm Air
 Canadian North
 Cathay Pacific
 Central Mountain Air
 Emirates 
 Etihad Airways
 Eurowings
 Eurowings Discover
 GOL Linhas Aéreas Inteligentes
 Gulf Air
 Juneyao Airlines
 Middle East Airlines
 Olympic Air 
 Oman Air
 PAL Airlines 
 SriLankan Airlines
 SunExpress 
 Virgin Australia
 Vistara

June 2013 announcements
On June 27, 2013, it was announced that Aimia had signed a conditional agreement with Toronto-Dominion Bank (TD) to become a credit-card partner as of January 1, 2014, and that Aimia would seek to terminate its decades-long relationship with CIBC. After the announcement, Aimia's stock rose by 11 percent.

In response, CIBC suggested that Aimia was attempting to nullify CIBC's right of first refusal. CIBC had already been hinting that it was dissatisfied with its arrangement with Aeroplan and might start its own loyalty program.

Aimia's conditional deal with TD would last ten years and involve an up-front payment of $100 million. Aimia said that CIBC had until August 9, 2013, to exercise its right of first refusal by matching the terms of the proposed TD contract.

In another announcement, Aimia cancelled Aeroplan's "seven-year mileage redemption policy". The policy had originally come into effect at the beginning of 2007, and provided that all miles would expire if unused after seven years, with the accumulated mileage of all customers as of January 1, 2007, expiring at the end of 2013. Aimia CEO Rupert Duchesne told Bloomberg news service that people had been worried there would be a run on Aimia's cash flow in 2013, but cancelling the seven-year expiration policy removes that worry.

In addition, on June 27, Aeroplan announced the launch of Distinction, a tiered recognition program that rewards top accumulating members based on total Aeroplan Miles earned across all coalition partners, with preferential mileage levels for redemption, bonus mile offers, and exclusive privileges. Benefits begin as of January 1, 2014, and include three status levels based on a member's total eligible mileage accumulation during the calendar year: dSilver (25,000 miles), dBlack (50,000 miles), and dDiamond (100,000 miles).

References

External links

 

Air Canada
Aimia (company)
Aimia Inc.
Customer loyalty programs in Canada
Frequent flyer programs
1984 establishments in Quebec
2002 mergers and acquisitions
2019 mergers and acquisitions